Philippa Charlotte Matthews (née Middleton; born 6 September 1983) is an English socialite, author and columnist. She is the younger sister of Catherine, Princess of Wales.

Born in Reading and raised in Bucklebury, Berkshire, Middleton attended Marlborough College before graduating with a degree in English literature from the University of Edinburgh. She worked at firms for public relations and event management before joining her parents' party supply company. Middleton began receiving media attention during her sister's relationship with Prince William, and her appearance at their wedding was subject to widespread coverage. She has also penned two books and previously contributed to Vanity Fair and The Sunday Telegraph columns.

Middleton married James Matthews, a hedge fund manager and the heir apparent to the lairdship of Glen Affric, in 2017. They have three children.

Early life and education
Philippa Charlotte Middleton was born on 6 September 1983 at the Royal Berkshire Hospital in Reading, Berkshire, England. She is the second of three children born to Michael Middleton (born 1949), a former British Airways flight dispatcher, and Carole Middleton (née Goldsmith; born 1955), a former flight attendant. Her father is a member of a wealthy family from Yorkshire linked to the British aristocracy. Her mother descends from labourers and coal miners from County Durham. She was christened at St Andrew's Bradfield, Berkshire. The family resided in Bradfield Southend. Middleton has an older sister, Catherine, Princess of Wales, and a younger brother, James.

The Middletons moved to Amman, Jordan in May 1984, where her father worked for British Airways, before returning to Berkshire in September 1986. In 1987, Middleton's mother founded Party Pieces, a mail-order party supply company, estimated to be worth £30 million, though accounts show that the company has lost £1.068 million during the COVID-19 pandemic. In 1995, her family moved to the village of Bucklebury. Middleton was first educated at St Andrew's School, a private boarding school in Pangbourne and then Downe House School, a girls' day and boarding school in Cold Ash. She was a boarder at Marlborough College, where she held a sports/all-rounder scholarship. Middleton then graduated from the University of Edinburgh with an undergraduate MA in English literature. She shared a house with Lord Edward Innes-Ker, a son of the Duke of Roxburghe, and with Earl Percy, heir apparent of the Duke of Northumberland.

In 2022, Middleton earned her postgraduate master's degree in Physical Education, Sport and Physical Literacy from University of Wales Trinity Saint David.

Career
Following her graduation, Middleton briefly worked in 2008 at a public relations firm promoting luxury products. She then had an events management job with Table Talk, a company based in London that organises corporate events and parties. In 2008, Tatler magazine named Middleton "the Number 1 Society Singleton", ahead of singer-songwriter James Blunt and Princess Eugenie of York, although in the same Tatler article she was described as someone who "goes to a lot of parties, but mainly as the caterer." Since then, she has often been described as a socialite. As part of a duo with her elder sister, Middleton has received wide press coverage, focusing on her social life and her lifestyle. In April 2012, Time magazine listed Middleton as one of the 100 Most Influential People in the World.

Middleton has worked part-time for her parents' company Party Pieces, editing the web magazine Party Times. Penguin Books paid Middleton a £400,000 advance for a book on party planning. The book, entitled Celebrate, was published in autumn 2012, and had lower than anticipated sales as many reviewers mocked it for the obviousness of its content. In March 2013, Middleton parted from her literary agent.

Middleton is also a regular columnist for several publications. She has contributed articles to The Spectator magazine since December 2012 and began having a food column in the supermarket magazine Waitrose Kitchen beginning in spring 2013. In June 2013 she was named a contributing editor of Vanity Fair. She went on to write a series of columns for the magazine. Beginning in September 2013, Middleton also wrote a fortnightly sports and social column for The Sunday Telegraph. Middleton discontinued writing for The Telegraph in May 2014.

In May 2013, she became the sole director and shareholder of PXM Enterprises Limited. The company was headquartered at 19 Portland Place in London. Middleton closed the company down in mid-2017.

Philanthropy
In April 2013, Middleton became an ambassador to the Mary Hare School for deaf children in Berkshire. In June 2014, Middleton became an ambassador to the British Heart Foundation (BHF). That month, she took part in the Race Across America, a 3,000 mile cycling race across the United States, followed by the Bosphorus Cross-Continental Swimming Race, a 6.5 km swimming competition in Istanbul, as two fundraising opportunities for the BHF. Her bicycle was also auctioned on eBay for the BHF. She then attended the BHF's Roll out the Red Ball at the Park Lane Hotel on 10 February 2015. She auctioned one of her L.K.Bennett dresses at the ball. 

In June 2015, she collaborated with the British brand Tabitha Webb on designing a floral pink dress and a lightweight scarf, with the proceeds from selling the items donated to the BHF. She took part in the London to Brighton Bike Ride for the BHF on 21 June 2015. In September 2015, Middleton participated in a 47-mile swim-run competition in Sweden alongside her brother and her future husband, James Matthews, to raise money for the Michael Matthews Foundation, a charity founded in honour of Matthews' brother who died descending from the peak of Everest. In September 2016, Middleton released her second book, Heartfelt, whose proceeds go to the British Heart Foundation.

Personal life

Middleton served as the maid of honour at her sister Catherine's wedding in 2011 to Prince William. At the wedding, Middleton's dress, which was created by Sarah Burton of Alexander McQueen, who also created the bride's dress, was highly praised in the media. Made of ivory crêpe fabric, it was styled with a cowl at the front and organza-covered buttons at the back. Copies of the dress were soon available on the High Street where there was a great demand for them. Similar to her sister, Middleton is reported to have had her own effect in sales of particular products and brands, a trend which has been referred to as "Pippa Middleton effect".

In April 2011, the Middleton family contacted the Press Complaints Commission (PCC) to complain about Pippa and her mother facing "harassment" by photographers. The PCC contacted newspaper editors with an advisory notice to remind them of their ethical obligations. In May 2011, the family complained to the PCC after photographs of Pippa Middleton, her sister, and their mother in bikinis while on holiday in 2006 on board a yacht off Ibiza were published in the Mail on Sunday, Daily Mail, News of the World, and Daily Mirror. One of the photographs showed Pippa Middleton topless, which prompted the family to complain about newspapers breaching the editors' code of practice by invading their privacy. In September 2011, Daily Mail, the Mail on Sunday, and Daily Mirror all agreed to have the images removed from their website and never publish them again following a deal negotiated by the Press Complaints Commission. In September 2016, Middleton's iPhone was hacked. The Sun reported it had been approached by a hacker who claimed to have 3,000 images from her iCloud account and demanded £50,000 for them. The hacker was arrested that same month.

In July 2016, in the Lake District, Middleton became engaged to James Matthews, a hedge fund manager who is a former professional racing driver. The couple married on 20 May 2017 at St Mark's Church, at Englefield Estate, Berkshire, near Bucklebury Manor, the Middleton family home. Matthews' father is Laird of Glen Affric, a 10,000 acre estate in Scotland which he will inherit. Consequently, Middleton will one day become Lady Glen Affric. Presently, she can use the courtesy title Mrs Matthews of Glen Affric the Younger. Their first child, a son named Arthur Michael William, was born on 15 October 2018 at St Mary's Hospital, London. Their second child, a daughter named Grace Elizabeth Jane, was born on 15 March 2021. Their third child, another daughter, named Rose, was born on June 2022.

Arms

Bibliography

References

External links

1983 births
Living people
20th-century English people
21st-century English writers
20th-century English women
21st-century English women writers
Alumni of the University of Edinburgh
British women columnists
English columnists
English socialites
English women philanthropists
Matthews family (UK)
People educated at Downe House School
People educated at Marlborough College
People educated at St Andrew's School, Pangbourne
People from Bucklebury
People from Reading, Berkshire
Middleton family (British)
The Spectator people
Vanity Fair (magazine) people
The Daily Telegraph people